Noël is a holiday album, the third studio album by Catholic group The Priests. It was released on 6 December 2010 on Epic Records, and reached number 9 in the Irish Albums Chart.

Track listing
 "Ding Dong Merrily On High"
 "The First Nowell"
 "Sussex Carol"
 "Little Drummer Boy/Peace On Earth"
 "The Holly And The Ivy"
 "Away In A Manger"
 "God Rest Ye Merry Gentlemen"
 "In The Bleak Midwinter"
 "In Dulci Jubilo"
 "Joy To The World"
 "Silent Night"
 "O Come All Ye Faithful"
 "What Child Is This"
 "Hark The Herald Angels Sing"
 "Little Drummer Boy/Peace On Earth" featuring Shane MacGowan

Charts

References

External links
 The Priests Official Website

2010 Christmas albums
Christmas albums by artists from Northern Ireland
Classical Christmas albums
The Priests albums
Epic Records albums